Emydopidae is a family of dicynodont therapsids.

References

Dicynodonts
Permian first appearances
Permian extinctions